The Broncos–Steelers rivalry is a National Football League (NFL) rivalry between the Denver Broncos and the Pittsburgh Steelers. The rivalry stemmed from the eight playoff matchups between the two teams, some of which featured upset victories. Of the eight meetings, six resulted in the winner eventually advancing to the Super Bowl.

History

1970s: Steel Curtain vs. Orange Crush
Despite winning six Super Bowl championships compared to the Broncos' three, the Steelers have generally fared worse against the Broncos in their history, losing 20 of 33 matchups with one tie, including a 3–5 playoff record. The Broncos are currently one of four teams to have a winning record against the Steelers, along with the Jacksonville Jaguars, Las Vegas Raiders and New England Patriots.

The two teams first met in the playoffs during the 1977 Divisional Round. In Denver's NFL playoff debut, they defeated the Steelers 34–21 as quarterback Craig Morton scored two touchdowns against Pittsburgh's fabled Steel Curtain defense. On the other hand, Denver's Orange Crush Defense forced three interceptions against Terry Bradshaw. An immediate rematch then took place in the 1978 Divisional Round. Thanks to six Pittsburgh sacks and Bradshaw's two-touchdown and 272-yard performance, the Steelers defeated the Broncos 33–10. In both instances, the winner eventually faced the Dallas Cowboys in the Super Bowl, with the Broncos losing Super Bowl XII and the Steelers winning Super Bowl XIII.

1980s–1990s: John Elway era
Legendary Broncos quarterback John Elway made his NFL debut against the Steelers in the 1983 season. The future Hall of Famer completed 1 of 8 passes for 14 yards, was sacked four times and intercepted once. Backup Steve DeBerg eventually led the Broncos to a 14–10 victory. Elway also made his playoff debut against the Steelers in the 1984 Divisional Round. Heading into the match, Denver finished 13–3 and were favored against the 9–7 Steelers. In that game, Elway passed for 184 yards and scored two touchdowns, but was intercepted twice and sacked four times in Denver's 17–24 upset loss. The two teams would meet again in the 1989 Divisional Round. This time, however, Elway performed well, with 239 passing yards, 44 rushing yards, one touchdown and one interception. Mel Bratton's one-yard score sealed the Broncos' 24–23 win, and Denver eventually made it to Super Bowl XXIV in a losing effort. It was also the final playoff game coached by the Steelers' Chuck Noll. 

Eight years later, the Broncos and the Steelers faced each other in the 1997 AFC Championship Game. It was a rematch of their Week 15 encounter during the 1997 regular season, in which the Steelers upset the Broncos 35–24 in Pittsburgh. Even though the Broncos had a better record (12–4) than the Steelers (11–5), Pittsburgh hosted the title game by virtue of winning the AFC Central, whereas Denver qualified as a Wild Card. This time, however, Denver avenged its regular season defeat with a 24–21 victory, with the Broncos defense intercepting Steelers quarterback Kordell Stewart three times and Terrell Davis rushing for 139 yards and a touchdown. The victory propelled the Broncos to Super Bowl XXXII, which they won for the first of two consecutive titles. Those titles capped off Elway's Hall of Fame career, retiring after the 1998 season. Ironically, the backup quarterback of the Broncos' two Super Bowl teams under Elway was Bubby Brister, who had faced Elway in the aforementioned 1989 Divisional Round game.

2000s-present: Roethlisberger, Tebow and Manning
Another eight-year wait took place before the two teams faced each other in the playoffs. In the 2005 AFC Championship Game, the sixth-seeded Steelers (11–5) were underdogs against the 13–3 Broncos, who had defeated the rival and two-time defending champion New England Patriots in the Divisional Round. However, the Steelers dominated the Broncos in a 34–17 victory. Steelers quarterback Ben Roethlisberger, who was making his first start in the rivalry, finished with 275 passing yards, two passing touchdowns and one rushing touchdown, while the defense forced four turnovers off Broncos starter Jake Plummer.

The Broncos and Steelers renewed their rivalry in the 2011 Wild Card Round. The Broncos, despite winning the AFC West and hosting the game, finished with an 8–8 record and were underdogs against the 12–4 Steelers. However, Denver prevailed in a 29–23 overtime upset, as quarterback Tim Tebow passed for an 80-yard touchdown to Demaryius Thomas on the first play. Tebow finished with 316 passing yards, 50 rushing yards and three overall touchdowns, but was traded after the season when the Broncos signed Peyton Manning.

Manning made his Broncos debut against the Steelers during Week 1 of the 2012 season, and led Denver to a 31–19 victory. In that game, Manning finished with 253 yards and two touchdowns on 19–26 passing attempts. The 2015 season would be Manning's last in the NFL, and the two teams faced each other twice. The first was on Week 15 of the regular season, which Pittsburgh won 34–27 as Manning sat out the game due to a bout with plantar fasciitis. However, in the Divisional Round, Denver eliminated Pittsburgh from the playoffs with a 23–16 victory behind their "No Fly Zone" defensive unit led by Von Miller and DeMarcus Ware. Manning, for his part, finished with 222 passing yards to go along with no touchdowns or interceptions, and running back C. J. Anderson sealed the game with a one-yard touchdown run late in the fourth quarter. The Broncos went on to win Super Bowl 50.

The first post-Manning meeting in the rivalry took place on November 25, 2018 in Denver. The 7-2-1 Steelers entered the game as heavy favorites to defeat the 4-6 Broncos. However, in one of the more notable meetings of the rivalry, Broncos QB Case Keenum threw for 197 yards and two touchdowns, with no turnovers, to guide Denver to a 24-17 upset victory. Roethlisberger, meanwhile, threw for 462 yards, including a 97-yard touchdown pass to wide receiver JuJu Smith-Schuster to open the second half scoring, but also threw two costly second-half interceptions, including a goal-line interception to Broncos defensive tackle Shelby Harris on the game's final play that sealed Denver's victory. Despite outgaining the Broncos in total yardage, first downs, yards per play, time of possession, and several other key stats, the Steelers committed four costly turnovers that the Broncos turned into 14 points. This game would also mark the beginning of collapses for both teams to end the season. After this loss, the Steelers proceeded to lose three out of their final five games and finished 9-6-1, missing the playoffs by a half-game and losing the division to the rival Baltimore Ravens. Denver, meanwhile, moved to 6-6 with a win over the Bengals the following week, but then immediately followed that up with a four-game losing streak to end the season with a 6-10 record, leading to the dismissal of head coach Vance Joseph following season's end.

The two teams met at Heinz Field on September 20, 2020 in what was the first home game for Roethlisberger in over a year after he missed all but two games in 2019 due to an elbow injury. After the Steelers knocked out Broncos starting QB Drew Lock early in the first quarter with a shoulder injury, the game was expected to be a runaway Pittsburgh victory, but it was anything but. After falling behind 17-3 at halftime, the Broncos, behind backup QB Jeff Driskel, rallied back to pull within five points heading into the final minutes of the game. After forcing a Steelers punt, the Broncos were facing a fourth down with two yards to go at the Steelers 15-yard line, but Driskel was sacked by Steelers safety Terrell Edmunds to give the ball back to Pittsburgh. Denver had an opportunity to get the ball back again, but Steelers running back James Conner broke away on a 59-yard run to the Broncos 10-yard line, sealing a 26-21 Steelers win. Roethlisberger finished the game with 311 yards, two touchdowns, and an interception, while Conner had 106 yards rushing and a touchdown on 16 carries. Driskel threw for 256 yards, two touchdowns, and an interception in the loss.

On October 10, 2021, the two teams met in Pittsburgh for a Week 5 matchup in what proved to be the final start in the series for Roethlisberger, who retired after the season. Coming into this game with a three-game losing streak, the Steelers led the Broncos 24-6 entering the fourth quarter, but Broncos quarterback Teddy Bridgewater rallied the team back within five points following two touchdown passes. Despite Steelers kicker Chris Boswell kicking a late field goal to make the score 27-19, Bridgewater and the Broncos had a chance to send the game to overtime. Facing fourth-and-goal from the Steelers three-yard line, Bridgewater's final pass was intercepted by Steelers cornerback James Pierre, sealing a Pittsburgh victory and snapping a three-game losing streak for the team. For his career, Roethlisberger finished with a 4-6 record against the Broncos, which included a 1-2 playoff record. 

The two teams are scheduled to meet again in 2024 in Denver.

Game results 

|-
| 
| style="| Broncos  16–13
| Mile High Stadium
| Broncos  1–0
| First meeting at Mile High Stadium. First season following the AFL–NFL merger. Steelers move to the American Football Conference. First start in the series for Terry Bradshaw.
|-
| 
| style="| Broncos  22–10
| Three Rivers Stadium
| Broncos  2–0
| First meeting at Three Rivers Stadium.
|-
| 
| style="| Broncos  23–13
| Three Rivers Stadium
| Broncos  3–0
| 
|-
| 
| Tie  
| Mile High Stadium
| Broncos  3–0–1
| Steelers win Super Bowl IX.
|-
| 
| style="| Steelers  20–9
| Three Rivers Stadium
| Broncos  3–1–1
| Steelers win Super Bowl X.
|-
| 
| style="| Broncos  21–7
| Mile High Stadium
| Broncos  4–1–1
| 
|-
! 1977 playoffs
! style="| Broncos  34–21
! Mile High Stadium
! Broncos  5–1–1
! AFC Divisional Round. Broncos lose Super Bowl XII.
|-
| 
| style="| Steelers  21–17
| Mile High Stadium
| Broncos  5–2–1
| 
|-
! 1978 playoffs
! style="| Steelers  33–10
! Three Rivers Stadium
! Broncos  5–3–1
! AFC Divisional Round. Steelers win Super Bowl XIII.
|-
| 
| style="| Steelers  42–7
| Three Rivers Stadium
| Broncos  5–4–1
| Most lopsided Steelers victory of the series. Final start in the series for Terry Bradshaw. Steelers win Super Bowl XIV. 
|-

|-
| 
| style="| Broncos  14–10
| Three Rivers Stadium
| Broncos  6–4–1
| John Elway's first NFL game. 
|-
! 1984 playoffs
! style="| Steelers  24–17
! Mile High Stadium
! Broncos  6–5–1
! AFC Divisional Round. Steelers hand Broncos their first playoff defeat at home.
|-
| 
| style="| Broncos  31–23
| Three Rivers Stadium
| Broncos  7–5–1
| 
|-
| 
| style="| Broncos  21–10
| Three Rivers Stadium
| Broncos  8–5–1
| Broncos lose Super Bowl XXI.
|-
| 
| style="| Steelers  39–21
| Three Rivers Stadium
| Broncos  8–6–1
| 
|-
| 
| style="| Broncos  34–7
| Mile High Stadium
| Broncos  9–6–1
| Most lopsided Broncos victory of the series. 
|-
! 1989 playoffs
! style="| Broncos  24–23
! Mile High Stadium
! Broncos  10–6–1
! AFC Divisional Round. Final playoff game for Steelers head coach Chuck Noll. Broncos lose Super Bowl XXIV.
|-

|-
| 
| style="| Steelers  34–17
| Mile High Stadium
| Broncos  10–7–1
| 
|-
| 
| style="| Broncos  20–13
| Mile High Stadium
| Broncos  11–7–1
| 
|-
| 
| style="| Broncos  37–13
| Mile High Stadium
| Broncos  12–7–1
| Final meeting at Mile High Stadium.
|-
| 
| style="| Steelers  35–24
| Three Rivers Stadium
| Broncos  12–8–1
| 
|-
! 1997 playoffs
! style="| Broncos  24–21
! Three Rivers Stadium
! Broncos  13–8–1
! AFC Championship Game. Final start in the series for John Elway. Final meeting at Three Rivers Stadium. Broncos win Super Bowl XXXII.
|-

|-
| 
| style="| Broncos  17–14
| Invesco Field at Mile High
| Broncos  14–8–1
| First meeting at Invesco Field (now Empower Field at Mile High).
|-
! 2005 playoffs
! style="| Steelers  34–17
! Invesco Field at Mile High
! Broncos  14–9–1
! AFC Championship Game. First start in the series for Ben Roethlisberger. Steelers win Super Bowl XL, becoming the first #6 seed to do so after no previous #6 seed from either conference ever managed to advance past the Divisional Round (excluding the 1982 strike-shortened season).
|-
| 
| style="| Broncos  31–20
| Heinz Field
| Broncos  15–9–1
| First meeting at Heinz Field.
|-
| 
| style="| Broncos  31–28
| Invesco Field at Mile High
| Broncos  16–9–1
| 
|-
| 
| style="| Steelers  28–10
| Invesco Field at Mile High
| Broncos  16–10–1
| 
|-

|-
! 2011 playoffs
! style="| Broncos  
! Sports Authority Field at Mile High
! Broncos  17–10–1
! AFC Wild Card Round. Demaryius Thomas scores game-winning touchdown reception from Tim Tebow. First NFL overtime game played under modified sudden death rules.
|-
| 
| style="| Broncos  31–19
| Sports Authority Field at Mile High
| Broncos  18–10–1
| Peyton Manning's first Broncos start.
|-
| 
| style="| Steelers  34–27
| Heinz Field
| Broncos  18–11–1
|  Broncos win Super Bowl 50.
|-
! 2015 playoffs
! style="| Broncos  23–16
! Sports Authority Field at Mile High
! Broncos  19–11–1
! AFC Divisional Round. Peyton Manning's final start in the series.
|-
| 
| style="| Broncos  24–17
| Sports Authority Field at Mile High
| Broncos  20–11–1
| 
|-

|-
| 
| style="| Steelers  26–21
| Heinz Field
| Broncos  20–12–1
| 
|-
| 
| style="| Steelers  27–19
| Heinz Field
| Broncos  20–13–1
| Final start in the series for Ben Roethlisberger.
|-

|-
| Regular season
| style="|
| 
| 
| 
|-
| Postseason
| style="|
| Broncos 4–2
| Tied 1–1
| AFC Wild Card Round: 2011. AFC Divisional Round: 1977, 1978, 1984, 1989, 2015. AFC Championship Game: 1997, 2005.
|-
| Regular and postseason 
| style="|
| 
| 
|  
|-

See also
National Football League rivalries

References

National Football League rivalries
Denver Broncos
Pittsburgh Steelers
Pittsburgh Steelers rivalries
Denver Broncos rivalries